Clinton Drew Dempsey (born March 9, 1983) is an American former professional soccer player who played as a forward and midfielder. During his career, he played in the Premier League for Fulham and Tottenham Hotspur and in Major League Soccer for New England Revolution and Seattle Sounders FC. ESPN, Fox Sports, and NBC Sports have each ranked Dempsey as the greatest men's American soccer player in history.

A native of Nacogdoches, Texas, Dempsey spent his youth career with the Dallas Texans before joining Furman University's men's soccer team in 2001. In 2004, Dempsey was drafted by the New England Revolution, where he scored 25 goals in 71 appearances. Between 2007 and 2012, Dempsey played for Fulham in the Premier League, eventually becoming the club's leading Premier League goalscorer. Dempsey also became the first American player to score a hat-trick in the Premier League during a 5–2 win against Newcastle United in 2012.

On August 31, 2012, Tottenham signed Dempsey for a fee of $9.6 million, then a record signing for an American. Dempsey scored 12 goals in one season with Tottenham, giving him 72 goals across all competitions for Premier League clubs—the most by an American in a top-tier European league. He was signed by the Seattle Sounders the following year and played 115 matches for the club, scoring 47 goals, and leading the club to win the 2014 Supporters' Shield. During the 2016 season, Dempsey was diagnosed with an irregular heartbeat and missed the team's run to the MLS Cup. Dempsey returned the following season and announced his retirement from professional soccer on August 29, 2018.

Dempsey represented the United States at the 2003 FIFA World Youth Championship and made his first appearance with the senior team on November 17, 2004, against Jamaica. He earned more than 140 caps and scored 57 international goals, making him the nation's fourth-most capped player and tying him with Landon Donovan as the top all-time scorer with 57 goals. Dempsey has represented the United States at four CONCACAF Gold Cups (winning three), helped them to the final of the 2009 FIFA Confederations Cup, and scored in each of the three FIFA World Cups he attended.

In 2022, Dempsey was inducted into the National Soccer Hall of Fame.

Early life and career
Dempsey was born in Nacogdoches, Texas, and is of Irish ancestry on his father's side. For much of his childhood, Dempsey's family lived in a trailer park where he and his siblings grew up playing soccer with the complex's large population of Hispanic immigrants.

In his teens, Dempsey maintained these ties playing in a local Mexican-dominated adult league. His older brother, Ryan, was offered a tryout for the Dallas Texans, an elite youth soccer club, and brought Dempsey, who was noticed and recruited while passing time juggling a ball on the sidelines.

Dempsey became a standout on the team at an early age but had to quit due to financial constraints as his eldest sister Jennifer was becoming a ranked youth tennis player. Several parents of his teammates with the Texans offered to assist the Dempseys with expenses and travel, allowing him to rejoin the club.

On November 27, 1995, Dempsey's 16-year-old sister Jennifer died from a brain aneurysm. Dempsey was devastated with the family's loss and later explained that this event helped him develop a deeper motivation to pursue soccer in honor of his sister.

He went on to be the captain and high scorer of the Texans and was honored with the MVP of the Tampa Bay Sun Bowl tournament. Dempsey studied the play of Argentina's national team, especially Diego Maradona, and was heartbroken when the news came to Nacogdoches that Maradona would not be playing in the 1994 World Cup game played in the Cotton Bowl. He attended Furman University as a health and exercise science major and a key player for Paladins soccer.

Club career

New England Revolution
The New England Revolution selected Clint Dempsey eighth overall in the 2004 MLS SuperDraft. In his rookie season, he started 23 of 24 matches scoring seven goals. Dempsey helped the Revolution to the Eastern Conference Finals and earned 2004 MLS Rookie of the Year Honors. He was also named the 2004 Man of the Year by the Midnight Riders. In 2005, Dempsey contributed ten goals and nine assists in 26 games. He scored the game-winning goal in the Eastern Conference Final on his way to an appearance in the MLS Cup Final.

In 2006, Dempsey added eight more goals, but missed significant time in the playoffs due to injury. He came on as a substitute in the MLS Cup Final, but the Revolution lost their second straight final, this time in a penalty shoot-out.

Fulham

2006–07 season
In December 2006, English club Fulham offered MLS $4 million for the transfer of Dempsey, then the largest amount ever offered for an MLS player, and he became another American addition to a Cottagers squad which included U.S. internationals Brian McBride and Carlos Bocanegra.

On January 11, 2007, he was granted a work permit from the Home Office as Fulham announced his signing on a long-term deal. This made Dempsey the most expensive American export to the Premier League in a deal worth a reported £2 million. He made his Fulham debut in a 1–1 home draw against Tottenham Hotspur on January 20, 2007. His FA Cup debut followed seven days later in a 3–0 home win over Stoke City.

Dempsey scored his first goal for Fulham on May 5 when he struck the only goal of a 1–0 home win over Liverpool. This goal saved Fulham from relegation and effectively guaranteed their place in the top-flight for the following season.

2007–08 season
Dempsey was not in the starting XI for the first three matches of the 2007–08 season, but after an injury to Brian McBride, he came into the side as a striker and scored in a 2–1 defeat against Aston Villa. He followed this up by scoring in Fulham's next fixture in a 3–3 home draw against Tottenham on September 1.

Two weeks later, he opened the scoring in Fulham's 1–1 away draw against Wigan Athletic.

These goals gave Dempsey three in as many games. On September 29, Dempsey was involved in an aerial collision with John Terry during a 0–0 draw at Stamford Bridge which resulted in Terry later being substituted. There was some suggestion that Dempsey used a deliberate elbow on Terry; however, referee Martin Atkinson did not report the incident to The Football Association.

On November 3, Dempsey scored during Fulham's 3–1 home win over Reading to secure just a second league win of the season.

He scored his last goals of the season in a 1–1 home draw with Wigan Athletic and a 5–1 away loss to Tottenham in December.

In May 2008, Fulham announced Dempsey had signed a contract extension which would keep him at the club until the summer of 2010. Fulham beat Portsmouth 1–0 on the final day of the season to secure Premier League status for another year. He ended the season as Fulham's top Premier League goalscorer with six goals.

2008–09 season
Dempsey made the Fulham XI only once in the first eleven fixtures of the 2008–09 season but scored his first goal in a 1–1 away draw at Portsmouth on October 26 after coming on as a substitute. He replaced Zoltan Gera in the side and scored his first home goal of the season in a 3–0 win over Middlesbrough on December 20. Eight days later he scored twice in the West London derby against Chelsea which included a last-minute equalizer in a 2–2 home draw.

On February 24, 2009, Dempsey scored the first FA Cup goal of his career in a 2–1 home win over Swansea City in the fifth-round. His final home goal of the season came in a 2–1 defeat to Blackburn Rovers on March 11. Fulham came from a goal down to beat Manchester City 3–1 away from home as Dempsey scored two goals on April 12.

For the second successive season, Dempsey ended as Fulham's top Premier League goalscorer joint with Andrew Johnson with seven goals. These goals helped Fulham secure a seventh-place finish in the Premier League, the highest in the club's history, and confirmed their qualification for the newly formed UEFA Europa League for the following season.

2009–10 season
On August 13, 2009, Dempsey signed a contract extension to remain with Fulham through 2013.On August 20, he scored his first goal in European competition, in the new Europa League, netting Fulham's second goal in a 3–1 win against Amkar Perm in the play-off round.

On December 30, La Gazzetta dello Sport named Dempsey as one of the top eleven Premier League players of the season.

On January 17, 2010, Dempsey suffered a suspected cruciate knee ligament injury in a 2–0 away defeat to Blackburn Rovers.

On March 11, Dempsey returned, coming on in the last minute of Fulham's loss away to Juventus, and then completed 72 minutes of Fulham's 3–0 away loss to Manchester United in the league.

On March 18, Dempsey came off the bench against Juventus in their second-leg, last-16 tie in the Europa League and scored the winner on a long chip shot. Fulham won the game 4–1 and this game resulted in Fulham winning an award, as well as Dempsey receiving an award for his goal.

The Guardian suggested that the goal "might become the most famous goal in Fulham's history".

On May 12, Dempsey replaced Bobby Zamora in the 55th minute of the 2010 UEFA Europa League Final, thus making history in becoming the first ever American to appear in a major European final. In the end, Fulham lost the match, as Atlético Madrid's Diego Forlán scored in the 116th minute of extra time, giving Atlético a 2–1 win.

His performances throughout 2009–10 earned him the designation of Most Valuable Player among Americans in Europe by SoccerOverThere.com, among other sources.

2010–11 season
Dempsey was on the substitutes' bench for Fulham's first two away games of 2010–11, but became a regular starter, one of only five U.S. players in the Premier League to do so. On September 18, 2010, he scored an equalizing goal on 56 minutes with a header against Blackburn Rovers at Ewood Park in the 1–1 draw to continue Fulham's unbeaten record in the Barclays Premier League.

On October 2, he scored against West Ham United past Robert Green, the same keeper that he had scored against in the World Cup. He continued his form by scoring two goals against Wigan Athletic on October 30 as Fulham ran out 2–0 winners.

On January 22, 2011, Dempsey scored another double versus Stoke City, putting Fulham temporarily out of relegation contention.

On March 19, Dempsey became the first American player to score 10 goals in a Premier League season, beating Brian McBride's previous record of nine, also set while at Fulham in the 2005–06 season and 2006–07 season.

Dempsey broke Fulham's Premier League goalscoring record by netting twice in a 3–0 victory over Bolton on April 27, 2011. He has scored a total of 33 goals for the team in the Premier League, topping both Brian McBride and Steed Malbranque, each with 32. With these goals, he scored 12 goals for Fulham in the 2010–11 season.

Dempsey was voted Fulham player of the season for 2010–11 by the Fulham fans, and his 12 Premier League strikes meant he was the club's leading goalscorer for the campaign.

2011–12 season
Dempsey scored a brace in the first leg of Fulham's 2011–12 Europa League play-off clash against Dnipro Dnipropetrovsk at Craven Cottage. Dempsey ended with two goals as Fulham ran out 3–0 winners, setting up a comfortable second leg in Ukraine.

On December 5, 2011, Dempsey scored in the 85th minute to secure a 1–0 win against Liverpool at Craven Cottage. The goal propelled Dempsey to become the most prolific U.S. goalscorer in the Premier League, passing Fulham legend and fellow American Brian McBride. Dempsey scored his fifth Premier League goal of the campaign with a header in a 2–0 home win against Bolton on December 17, lifting his side six points clear of the drop zone.

In the club's West London derby against rivals Chelsea on Boxing Day, Dempsey scored the equalizing goal as the game ended in a 1–1 draw. Dempsey became only the second American to post a hat trick in the FA Cup behind Chris Cleary with the first hat-trick of his career on January 7 against Charlton Athletic in their FA Cup Third Round game that ended in a 4–0 victory. On January 21, 2012, Dempsey scored his first Premier League hat-trick against Newcastle while the game ended in a 5–2 win for Fulham and sent his goal tally in the Premier League to nine for the season.

With his hat-trick against Newcastle, he became the first ever U.S. player to score a hat-trick in the Premier League. Dempsey scored his 10th Premier League goal of the season, sixteenth in all competitions, in a 1–1 draw against former manager Roy Hodgson's West Brom on February 1, 2012.

Dempsey "assisted" another goal in a 2–1 win against Stoke City on February 11, 2012. His 28th-minute shot hit the crossbar and was deflected by Stoke goalkeeper Thomas Sørensen. It was therefore awarded as an own goal off the goalie. His form this season continued against Wolverhampton Wanderers where Dempsey scored twice in a 5–0 victory for Fulham.

On March 8, 2012, the day before Dempsey's 29th birthday, Fulham manager Martin Jol revealed that the club had opened talks with the North American over a new three-year contract.

Dempsey scored his fourteenth and fifteenth Premier League goals of the campaign, bringing his tally to twenty-one in all competitions, in a 3–0 away win over Bolton Wanderers on April 7, the first a free kick and the second a header. The strikes moved Dempsey past Louis Saha's record of thirteen Premier League goals for the club in a single season. Dempsey finished fourth on the FWA Footballer of the Year list behind the winner, Arsenal's Robin van Persie, and Manchester United pair Wayne Rooney and Paul Scholes, who came in second and third, respectively. Dempsey became the first American player to reach the milestone of fifty goals in the Premier League, with a free kick against Sunderland in the last home game of the season.

On August 31, 2012, Fulham confirmed Dempsey's transfer to Tottenham Hotspur.

Tottenham Hotspur
On August 31, 2012, Dempsey joined Tottenham Hotspur on a three-year contract for a fee believed to be in the region of $9 million.

The deal made Dempsey the highest salaried U.S. soccer player of all time. With the 23 shirt that he wore at Fulham and the number 8 that he usually wore on international duty unavailable, he opted for the number 2 jersey, more usually associated with the right-back, which he wore at Furman University. He scored his first and the eventual match-winning goal for Tottenham in a 3–2 win over Manchester United. It was the first time in 23 years that Tottenham had won at Old Trafford. He scored his second goal for Spurs in the 39th minute in an away game at Southampton in October. Dempsey's third and fourth goals were scored against Everton in an eventual 2–1 loss and a deflected effort against Reading on New Year's Day to help his Spurs side win 3–1. In the FA Cup 3rd round he scored a double against Coventry City.

On January 20, 2013, in driving snow at White Hart Lane against league leaders Manchester United, Dempsey was able to salvage a dramatic 1–1 draw for Spurs by slotting home a pass from Aaron Lennon in the 93rd minute. The goal was his fourth in four appearances in 2013. On January 27, 2013, Dempsey scored a looping header against Leeds United at Elland Road, in the FA Cup to bring the score to 2–1, however Tottenham Hotspur couldn't draw level throughout the rest of the game, leaving the result at 2–1 to Leeds at the whistle.

Dempsey was unable to make an impression against his old club on March 17, when Fulham came away from White Hart Lane with a 1–0 victory. On April 21, he scored the first of three goals for Tottenham in a 3–1 win over Manchester City at White Hart Lane. On May 12, Dempsey scored a long range goal and added an assist while playing against Stoke City to help Spurs win 2–1 and keep them in contention for the fourth Champions League spot. On April 11, 2013, Dempsey scored two goals against FC Basel in the second leg of the Europa League quarter-finals to send the match into extra time. Tottenham eventually lost the match on penalties and thus were eliminated from the competition.

Seattle Sounders 
On August 3, 2013, Dempsey signed with MLS club Seattle Sounders FC as a Designated Player on a four-year contract, for a transfer fee of $9 million. He again donned the number 2 shirt, forgoing the number 8 he usually wears for the United States and the number 23 he wore at Fulham. The previous user of the number 2 shirt, DeAndre Yedlin, moved to number 17. Dempsey made his league debut for Seattle on August 10, 2013, in a 2–1 victory over Toronto. Dempsey entered the match as a 34th-minute substitute after Obafemi Martins came off with an ankle injury.

Loan to Fulham
On December 24, 2013, Dempsey re-signed with Fulham on a two-month loan. He made his return debut on January 4, 2014, in the Third Round of the FA Cup against Norwich City. Dempsey played the entire game which resulted in a 1–1 draw, and subsequently took part in the replay at Craven Cottage, a 3–0 victory for Fulham.

 Return to Seattle 

Although no announcement was made by Fulham, Dempsey appeared in the Seattle squad to face Sporting Kansas City in the season opener on March 10, 2014. Dempsey had made a return to form, scoring a hat-trick against Portland Timbers, and recording braces against FC Dallas and the Colorado Rapids, leaving his goal tally at 8 in 5 games for 2014. He earned the MLS's Player of the Month award for April. Both Dempsey's 15 goals and 10 assists were MLS career highs, as Seattle won the Supporters' Shield, but were eliminated in the conference finals of the MLS Cup by eventual champions LA Galaxy.

On June 16, 2015, in the fourth round of the Lamar Hunt U.S. Open Cup against rivals the Portland Timbers, Dempsey was sent off for ripping up referee Daniel Radford's notebook in protest at the dismissal of Michael Azira. The Sounders finished the match with seven men through three dismissals and an injury, and lost 1–3 at home. For the incident, he was given a three-match MLS suspension and a fine, and banned from the Open Cup for two years in addition to a second fine.

On July 13, 2016, Dempsey picked up his first MLS red card after putting his hands in the face of FC Dallas midfielder Juan Esteban Ortiz, who came in with a late challenge on Dempsey. Earlier in the game, Dempsey scored and provided an assist on Jordan Morris's goal. On August 7, he scored a hat-trick against Orlando City to capture their second road victory of the 2016 season. Dempsey played his last game of the season on August 21 against Portland, picking up a brace in the 3–1 win while simultaneously setting a franchise record for the most goals by a player against one team in MLS play, with the goals being his 7th and 8th. While his absence in Seattle's next game at Houston was a scheduled rest, Dempsey was sidelined with an irregular heartbeat ahead of their Cascadia rivalry tie in Portland.

After returning to training in September, Dempsey was ruled out for the remainder of the season by general manager Garth Lagerwey on September 27.

Although there was speculation about the irregular heartbeat ending his career, Dempsey was eventually cleared to play in time for the 2017 MLS season. During the season Dempsey tallied 12 goals in 29 regular season appearances and was named MLS Comeback Player of the Year for 2017.

He announced his retirement from soccer on August 29, 2018.

International career

For the national team, Dempsey has frequently lined up as a striker due to his scoring threat and aerial ability, but his preferred and more normal role is off the striker.

Early career: 2005 and 2007 Gold Cups and 2006 World Cup

Dempsey first played for the United States national team at the 2003 FIFA World Youth Championship in the United Arab Emirates. He made his first appearance with the senior team on November 17, 2004, against Jamaica in qualification for the 2006 World Cup, replacing Ramiro Corrales for the final 23 minutes of a 1–1 draw at the Columbus Crew Stadium.

On May 28, 2005, he scored his first international goal on his sixth cap, a consolation in a 2–1 defeat to England at Soldier Field, Chicago, by heading in after a save by goalkeeper David James. Dempsey's first international tournament was the United States' victorious 2005 CONCACAF Gold Cup campaign; he netted their first goal, equalising as they came from behind to defeat Cuba 4–1 at Qwest Field in Seattle.

Dempsey was named to the US roster for the 2006 World Cup in Germany. He was the only American player to score a goal in the tournament, a group stage elimination, with his equalizing goal in the Americans' eventual 2–1 loss to Ghana. He won the highest individual honor in soccer in America when he was named Honda Player of the Year for 2006, beating Fulham teammates Kasey Keller and Brian McBride in a poll of sportswriters. Dempsey received 237 points in voting by 207 sports journalists to claim the award.

Dempsey was also present as the United States defended their title at the 2007 Gold Cup, again scoring their opening goal, the sole goal in a victory against Guatemala at The Home Depot Center; his side-footed shot from Taylor Twellman's assist gave the nation victory in Bob Bradley's first match as coach.

2009 Confederations Cup and 2010 World Cup
In the United States' opening 2010 World Cup qualifier, Dempsey recorded the then fastest goal in U.S. qualifying history with a chest trap and sliding shot 53 seconds into an 8–0 defeat of Barbados. But thereafter, Dempsey experienced a dip in form leading some to doubt his first-choice status with the national team. However, Dempsey turned his fortunes around in the 2009 FIFA Confederations Cup. In the final group stage match against Egypt, Dempsey scored a trademark diving header off a Jonathan Spector cross, making the final result 3–0. This, combined with Brazil's 3–0 victory against Italy in the other group match that was being played simultaneously, put the United States through to the semi-finals. In the semi-final match against Spain, Dempsey scored to put the U.S. up 2–0 to send them to the finals. He was named the Man of the Match for his performance. Dempsey scored in his third straight game in the Confederations Cup Final against Brazil, redirecting a similar cross from Spector in the 10th minute to open the scoring.

Following the loss, he was awarded the Bronze Ball as the tournament's 3rd best performer. He ended the World Cup qualifying campaign tied with Landon Donovan as the team's second top scorer, behind Jozy Altidore, with five goals in thirteen matches.

On June 12, 2010, Dempsey became the second American (after Brian McBride) to score in more than one World Cup when he scored the equalizer goal against England in the Americans' first game of the 2010 World Cup after the England goalkeeper Robert Green made a major error. Dempsey's disallowed goal later in the tournament against Algeria in the group stage was very controversial. Dempsey was called offside, but the replay showed that he was most likely not offside. Despite this call, his teammate Landon Donovan scored a late stoppage time goal to win the game 1–0.

2011 Gold Cup
During the 2011 Gold Cup, Dempsey played a key role in helping the United States advance to the final. In the group stages he recorded a goal in a 2–0 win over Canada, and in the quarter-finals, Dempsey also scored a goal in a 2–0 win over Jamaica. In the semi-finals against Panama, who had shockingly defeated the United States 1–2 in the group stage, Dempsey scored the only goal to advance the Americans to the final. With a sliding touch Dempsey redirected Landon Donovan's pass into the net.

On February 29, 2012, Dempsey scored the lone goal in an international friendly win against four-time World champion Italy. Jozy Altidore assisted on the goal, allowing the United States to win for the first time against Italy in eleven games played since 1934.

2014 World Cup and 2015 Gold Cup
Dempsey broke his own fastest-goal record in World Cup qualifying on September 7, scoring just 39 seconds into a 2–1 defeat against Jamaica in Kingston. During a qualifying match against Guatemala on October 16, 2012, Dempsey scored his 29th and 30th international goal, tying him with Brian McBride for third most goals scored for the United States national team. The goals helped the United States advance into the final qualifying stage for the 2014 World Cup.

In March 2013, Dempsey was given the captain's armband by Jürgen Klinsmann for the important World Cup qualifying matches versus Costa Rica and Mexico. On June 2, 2013, Dempsey scored two goals against Germany in a 4–3 win. The goals were his 34th and 35th overall for the national team, surpassing Eric Wynalda as second all-time top-goalscorer for the United States. Dempsey became the 14th American to reach 100 caps on September 6, 2013, netting a penalty in a 3–1 away defeat to Costa Rica in a qualifier.

In 2014, Dempsey was named as captain of the 23-man United States squad ahead of the FIFA World Cup. On June 16, he scored against Ghana 29 seconds into the group play match. It was the fastest goal in American World Cup history, and fifth fastest goal in all-time World Cup history. With this goal, Dempsey also became the first American player to score in three consecutive World Cups. Dempsey went on to suffer a broken nose midway through the first half as the United States defeated Ghana 2–1. In the following match against Portugal, Dempsey notched his fourth World Cup goal in a 2–2 draw. This goal drew Dempsey level with Bert Patenaude as the second-highest goalscoring American in the World Cup, one behind Landon Donovan.

Before the 2015 Gold Cup, Jurgen Klinsmann gave Michael Bradley the captain's armband, in wake of the U.S. Open Cup incident.

During the Gold Cup, Dempsey scored both U.S. goals in a 2–1 group stage win over Honduras at the Toyota Stadium in his native Texas. Three days later, at his former club ground in New England, he struck the only goal to defeat Haiti, sending his team into the quarter-finals, where he scored his first international hat-trick in a 6–0 victory against Cuba. In the third-place play-off, he scored his seventh goal of the tournament to equalize for a 1–1 draw against Panama, and also netted his attempt in the penalty shootout which his team eventually lost; he finished the tournament as its top scorer.

Copa América Centenario
In June 2016, Dempsey started all three group stage games of the Copa América Centenario. Against Costa Rica he recorded his 50th international goal, and against Paraguay he recorded his 51st international goal to help the U.S. finish first in the group and advance to the quarterfinals. The U.S. were eliminated in the semi-finals by Argentina. In the quarterfinal win over Ecuador, Dempsey scored the opening goal and assisted on the second goal, which was scored by Zardes.

2018 World Cup Qualification
Dempsey's first goal during qualification for the 2018 FIFA World Cup was scored in the 4–0 victory by the U.S. over Guatemala on March 29, 2016, at MAPFRE Stadium in Columbus, Ohio. He also earned an assist on the fourth goal of the evening, scored by Jozy Altidore.

On March 24, 2017, during the final round of qualification, Dempsey scored a hat trick in the 6–0 victory by the U.S. over Honduras, one goal from a free kick and the other two assisted by Christian Pulisic at Avaya Stadium in San Jose, CA. Four days after that, on March 28, he scored the U.S.'s lone goal, again assisted by Pulisic, in a 1–1 draw with Panama at Estadio Rommel Fernández in Panama City.

2017 Gold Cup
Dempsey was named to the 40-man preliminary roster for the 2017 CONCACAF Gold Cup by head coach Bruce Arena on June 3, 2017.

Dempsey was not named to the 23-man roster released on June 25, but was eligible to be called up as one of six roster replacements following the conclusion of the group stage. On July 16, Dempsey was called in to replace Dom Dwyer. He assisted Eric Lichaj's first international goal in the U.S.'s 2–0 victory over El Salvador in the quarterfinals on July 19, tying him with Claudio Reyna for fourth on the U.S. all-time assists list. On July 22, Dempsey assisted Altidore's goal and scored a free kick to defeat Costa Rica 0–2, sending the U.S. to the final and seeing Dempsey overtake Reyna for fourth place in assists with 20 and tie Landon Donovan for most U.S. goals of all time at 57.

Style of play

Dempsey is known for his versatility and ability to play either as a forward, winger or attacking midfielder, depending on the formation. As a result, he has been categorized interchangeably as a forward or midfielder, as evidenced in the 2010 and 2014 FIFA World Cup squads where he was classified as a forward (FW) in the latter tournament and a midfielder (MF) in the former. During his time in Fulham, he established himself as goal-scorer who is able to score with both his head and feet, especially during important matches. Critics have described him as "audacious" due to his penchant for the odd "wonder goal" and reputation as "the guy who walked onto the field and started doing backheels", leading former national team coach Bruce Arena to say of him, "He tries shit."

Dempsey has occasionally been prone to aggressive play including physical altercations with opponents over the course of his career, which have sometimes resulted in suspensions.

Personal life
Dempsey is married to Bethany Keegan Dempsey. They have five children and live in Pinehurst, North Carolina.

Dempsey is a practicing Catholic. He grew up in a Catholic family going to church every Sunday with his grandmother. He has spoken about his faith saying, "I play to the best of my abilities and am thankful for the many opportunities and amazing success God has given me. Through it all, I want to do right, not make mistakes, and live a life that is pleasing to Him."

Dempsey is a fan of the NFL's Houston Texans. Although not known for his fandom of hockey, he sounded the siren before the Carolina Hurricanes 2022 Stanley Cup Playoffs Round 2, Game 5 matchup against the New York Rangers in Raleigh, North Carolina, on May 27, 2022.

Music
One of Dempsey's passions outside of soccer is hip hop music. Using the alias "Deuce", he, along with fellow Texas rappers XO and the late Houston rapper Big Hawk from the Screwed Up Click, is featured rapping the song "Don't Tread" in a Nike soccer advertising campaign for the 2006 World Cup with the intention to showcase both the sport's working-class roots and the United States team ahead of the World Cup. The song's video is dedicated to his sister Jennifer, who, at age 16, was suddenly struck with a brain aneurysm, which proved fatal. The video ends with a shot of Dempsey placing a flower at his sister's grave.

Endorsements
Dempsey, along with global cover star Lionel Messi, features on the cover of EA Sports' multi-platform video game FIFA 15 in the U.S. & Canada.

Career statistics
Club

International

HonorsNew England RevolutionMLS Cup: runner-up 2005, 2006FulhamUEFA Europa League: runner-up 2009–10Seattle Sounders FCMLS Cup: 2016; runner-up 2017
Supporters' Shield: 2014
U.S. Open Cup: 2014United StatesFIFA Confederations Cup: runner-up 2009
CONCACAF Gold Cup: 2005, 2007, 2017; runner-up 2011Individual'
Fulham Player of the Season: 2010–11, 2011–12
FIFA Confederations Cup Bronze Ball: 2009
FIFA Confederations Cup Team of the Tournament: 2009
 CONCACAF Gold Cup Top Goalscorer: 2015
U.S. Soccer Athlete of the Year: 2007, 2011, 2012
Honda Player of the Year: 2006, 2011, 2012
MLS All-Star: 2005, 2014, 2015, 2016
MLS Rookie of the Year: 2004
 MLS Comeback Player of the Year: 2017
 IFFHS CONCACAF team of the decade 2011–2020
IFFHS CONCACAF Men's Team of All Time: 2021
Fulham top scorer: 2010–11, 2011–12

See also
List of top international men's football goal scorers by country
List of men's footballers with 100 or more international caps
List of men's footballers with 50 or more international goals

References

External links

Clint Dempsey at Premier League

1983 births
Living people
American people of Irish descent
People from Nacogdoches, Texas
Catholics from Texas
Soccer players from Texas
American soccer players
Association football forwards
Furman Paladins men's soccer players
New England Revolution draft picks
New England Revolution players
Fulham F.C. players
Tottenham Hotspur F.C. players
Seattle Sounders FC players
Major League Soccer players
Designated Players (MLS)
Major League Soccer All-Stars
Premier League players
United States men's under-20 international soccer players
United States men's international soccer players
2005 CONCACAF Gold Cup players
2006 FIFA World Cup players
2007 CONCACAF Gold Cup players
2009 FIFA Confederations Cup players
2010 FIFA World Cup players
2011 CONCACAF Gold Cup players
2014 FIFA World Cup players
2015 CONCACAF Gold Cup players
Copa América Centenario players
2017 CONCACAF Gold Cup players
CONCACAF Gold Cup-winning players
FIFA Century Club
American expatriate soccer players
American expatriate sportspeople in England
Expatriate footballers in England
National Soccer Hall of Fame members